David M. Harland is an author and space historian.  He lives in Scotland. Previously, he was a computer scientist at the University of Glasgow and worked on the Rekursiv project for Linn Products.

Publications
 Polymorphic Programming Languages : Design and Implementation (1984)
 Concurrency and Programming Languages (1986)
 REKURSIV: Object-oriented Computer Architecture (1988)
 The Space Shuttle: Roles, Missions and Accomplishments (1998)
 Jupiter Odyssey: the Story of NASA's Galileo Mission (2000)
 The Earth in Context: a Guide to the Solar System (2001)
 Creating the International Space Station (2002)
 Mission to Saturn: Cassini and the Huygens Probe (2002)
 The Big Bang: a View from the 21st Century (2003)
 The Story of the Space Shuttle (2004)
 The Story of Space Station Mir (2005)
 Water and the Search for Life on Mars (2005)
  Apollo: The Definitive Sourcebook (2006) with Richard W. Orloff
 Apollo EECOM: Journey of a Lifetime Sy Liebergot (2006)
 Space Systems Failures: Disasters and Rescues of Satellites, Rockets and Space Probes (2006)
 Cassini at Saturn: Huygen Results (2007)
  The First Men on the Moon: the Story of Apollo 11 (2007)
 Robotic Exploration of the Solar System (2007) with Paolo Ulivi
 Exploring the Moon: the Apollo Expedition (2008)
 Robotic exploration of the Solar System. Part 2, Hiatus and Renewal 1983-1996 (2009) with Paolo Ulivi
 How NASA Learned to Fly in Space: An Exciting Account of the Gemini Missions (2010)
 Apollo 12: on the Ocean of Storms (2011)
 Paving the Way for Apollo 11 (2011)
 Robotic Exploration of the Solar System: Part 3: Wows and Woes, 1997-2003 (2012) with Paolo Ulivi
  NASA Gemini, 1965-1966 (2015) with W. David Woods
 Enhancing Hubble's Vision: Service Missions that Expanded Our View of the Universe (2016) with David Shayler
 Moon: from 4.5 Billion Years Ago to the Present (2016)
 Universe: from 13.8 Billion Years Ago to the Infinite Future (2019)
 Mars: from 4.5 Billion Years Ago to the Present (2018)

References
David M. Harland's home page
WorldCat results for David M. Harland

Year of birth missing (living people)
Living people